Adam Diksa (born 15 January 1984), better known by his stage name Keiran Lee, is an English pornographic actor, director, and producer who works mainly for Brazzers. He is one of the highest-paid pornographic actors. He has received several awards, including an AVN Award for Favourite Male Performer and a UK Adult Film and Television Award for Best Male Actor.

Early life 
Lee was born Adam Diksa in the Littleover area of Derby on 15 January 1984, the son of an English mother and Indian father. He attended Saint Benedict Catholic Voluntary Academy in the Darley Abbey area of Derby. By the age of 18, he was working as a project manager for Network Rail.

Career 
Lee's career in porn began after his friends uploaded a naked picture of him to a swinging website. After seeing the post, a couple offered him a role in a porn film. He first performed in adult video in 2002 at the age of 18. He began freelancing in porn in England and then moved to the United States, where he signed an exclusive contract with Brazzers in 2005.

Lee performed in his first Brazzers video in 2008. In August 2011, Brazzers placed a billboard advertisement with a photo of Lee in a tank top and sunglasses on Sunset Boulevard. Dan Miller from XBIZ referred to it as "a landmark promotion for a male porn star". In 2012, it was reported that Brazzers had taken out an insurance policy with Lloyd's of London to insure Lee's penis for a reported $1 million. In October 2013, he made his feature film directorial debut with Hot Chicks Meet Big Fangs for Digital Playground.

In 2016, Lee appeared as a mentor and judge on The Sex Factor, an online reality series featuring 16 men and women competing for $1 million and a three-year porn contract. Lee, along with fellow porn stars Lexi Belle, Remy LaCroix, and Tori Black, would offer advice and judge the contestants throughout the competition. The series was critically panned, with reviewers saying Lee had "confused the deadpan tell-it-like-it-is judging technique of real TV with just straight up being a dickhead" while calling the judges in general "stilted" and "hard to watch".

As of May 2020, Lee has appeared in 1,553 videos for Brazzers, more than any other performer. He was inducted into the AVN Hall of Fame in 2022.

Personal life 

Lee married Swedish pornographic actress Puma Swede in 2009, and they divorced at an unknown date. He married American pornographic actress Kirsten Price in 2013. They reside in Calabasas, California, with their three children.

Lee is a supporter of his hometown football team Derby County FC and has said that he "schedules his whole life around" it. In 2011, while playing soccer for Hollywood United FC, he had to be hospitalised after breaking his jaw in two places.

Select filmography

Movies 
 As an actor: 
 Nasty Intentions (2009)
 Filthy Habits (2010)
 No Way Out (2014)
 Kill Bill (2015)
 In the Ass at Last (2016)
 As a director: 
 Hot Chicks Meet Big Fangs (2013)

Awards and nominations 
During his career, Lee has won two awards from 49 nominations. Some notable awards and nominations:

See also 
 List of British pornographic actors

References

External links 

 
 
 
 

Male pornographic film actors
1984 births
English male pornographic film actors
British male pornographic film actors
English people of Indian descent
Living people
People from Littleover
Male actors from Derbyshire
British pornographic film actors of Indian descent
English pornographic film directors
AVN Award winners